Valentin Miculescu  (born 4 September 1975) is a Romanian former footballer who last played for Liga II club FCM Reșița.

Club career
Miculescu had a spell in Hungary where he played for Békéscsaba Előre.

Personal life
Valentin's son, David Miculescu, is also a footballer.

References

External links
 

1975 births
Living people
Romanian footballers
Association football forwards
Liga II players
FC Politehnica Timișoara players
FC UTA Arad players
FC Bihor Oradea players
CS Unirea Sânnicolau Mare players
Nemzeti Bajnokság I players
Békéscsaba 1912 Előre footballers
Romanian expatriate footballers
Romanian expatriate sportspeople in Hungary
Expatriate footballers in Hungary
Sportspeople from Timișoara